Nahe may refer to:

Nahe (Rhine), a river in Rhineland-Palatinate and Saarland, Germany, tributary of the Rhine
Nahe (Schleuse), a river in Thuringia, Germany, tributary of the Schleuse
Nahe, Schleswig-Holstein, a municipality in the district of Segeberg, in Schleswig-Holstein, Germany
Nahe (wine region), region (Anbaugebiet) for quality wine in Germany
Nahe mine, a potash mine in southern Laos